Iczelion, known in Japan as , is a 2-episode Japanese original video animation (OVA) series released in 1995. It was created by Toshihiro Hirano, director of the original Fight! Iczer One and Iczer Reborn series. AIC and KSS were the animation production companies in charge of Iczelion. The series was licensed in North America by ADV Films.

Unlike its predecessor, Iczelion did not feature female-female intimacy. Although the series hinted at a possible continuation, none was ever written or created. The story seems to take place in an alternate timeline from Iczer-One and Iczer Reborn because of its placement in modern-day and with a seemingly different Nagisa.

Iczelion was also made into a radio drama series, released as three drama CDs. The radio drama served as a bridge between Iczer-3 and Iczelion, as characters from the Iczer-3 OVA series were featured in it, including Nagisa Kasumi, who became the title Iczelion instead of the OVA's Nagisa Kai. Iczel was also sent to earth by Iczer-3 in the radio drama.

Story

Kai Nagisa, a normal high school girl who wishes to one day become a professional wrestler, is suddenly approached by a robot known as an Iczel. Iczel urges her to help save the Earth from invading aliens called Geas. The Geas, led by Chaos and Cross, are bent on stripping Earth's resources and then destroying it. To fight the invaders, Nagisa must merge with Iczel and become a battle-suited warrior named "Iczelion". She is reluctant to take up this sudden unbelievable task and fight with the other Iczelions of Earth because Nagisa just wants to live a normal life without having such big responsibilities. Nagisa must overcome her fears and fight, together with other Iczelions, to prevent the invading alien forces from destroying their home planet, Earth.

Characters

Main Characters

A normal high school student who wishes to become a professional wrestler. One day, a robot named Iczel confronts Nagisa and urges her to help save the world from invading aliens. She struggles at first because she does not want to hold the responsibility of being an Iczelion and saving the world, but later realizes that she must protect those she cares about, giving her the strength to become an Iczelion and fight to save the Earth. She can enter Burst Acceleration Mode for a brief period of time.

Weapon: Beamsword, Handbeam, Barrier, Concentrate Fire-Blast.

A robot that confronts Nagisa and pleads her to help fight invading aliens that want to destroy the Earth. Iczel chooses Nagisa to become an Iczelion. Nagisa is reluctant in accepting the role but Iczel continuously pleads her to fight to protect her home planet. There are other Iczels on Earth that attend to their own Iczelions; Iczel Black, Iczel Gold, and Iczel Silver. Each Iczel has their own personality, which is similar to that of their Iczelion girl counterpart. Iczel is also referred to as Normal Type by the other Iczels.

Weapon: Barrier.

From all the Iczelion, she is the most direct and sure of herself. Her Iczelion signature attacks are gravity based, and she is also the most skilled with both her beam sword and in hand to hand combat. Nami currently seems to be the strongest and most capable of the Iczelions. She seem to have the most defensive and powerful Barrier out of the 4. Can also transfer all the suit power into her beam sword, critically boosting it power to access Gravity Slash.

Weapon: Duel Beamswords, Handbeam, Barrier, Gravity Barrier Ram, Gravity Well, Implode Gravity Vortex.

She is very energetic and agile. She tends to mock her opponents in battle but she shows that she is a capable fighter. She is probably the most girlish and enthusiastic of the Iczelion, but that doesn't mean that her fighting skills are weak. She displays one of the broadest range of attacks based on wind and earth. Her wind attacks are deployed by means of the weapon modules mounted on her hips.

Weapon: Barrier, Expanding Barrier Blast, Meteor Shower, Tornado, Tornado Kick, Double Super Tornado.

She is not so active like the other Iczelions, but is very calm, gentle and quiet. Kawai is the first to try to persuade Nagisa to fight alongside the other Iczelions and protect the Earth. Kawai is the one who explains why the Iczel were created. While other Iczelion may have their own reasons for fighting, Kawai firmly believes there is nothing more important than defending their home, Earth. Her signature weapons are her Beam Boomerangs. She can also enter Burst Teleport Mode for rapid short-distance evasion.

Weapon: Barrier, single forearm Beam Cutter, Dual Beam Boomerangs.

Villains

One of the main villains in the story. Cross is an android and was probably "created" by Big Gold before she was killed by Iczer-1. With her brother Chaos, she goes to different planets throughout the galaxy, stealing their resources and destroying them. She takes pleasure in killing their inhabitants and hunting down the Iczelion that protect those world. She is usually accompanied by three strong Geas called Voids. Cross seems to be the brawn between herself and her brother. She is eventually killed by Nagisa.

Another one of the main villains in the story. Chaos is also an android and is the brother of Cross. Together with his sister, they steal planet resources and destroy them afterwards. Chaos seems to be the brains between himself and his sister, commanding his army of Geas to do his bidding.

Sound Novel Staff

Japanese Staff
Original Work: Toshihiro Hirano
General Manager: Toshihiro Hirano
Screenplay: Gaku Nakamura
Design Work: Yasuhiro Moriki
Music: Michiaki Watanabe, Tatsumi Yano

Sound novel theme songs

Opening:

Lyrics: Kouichiro Maeda
Composition: Tatsumi Yano
Arrangement: Tatsumi Yano
Artist: Mari Sasaki

Ending:

Lyrics: Kouichiro Maeda
Composition: Tatsumi Yano
Arrangement: Tatsumi Yano
Artist: Yuri Shiratori

Image Song:

Lyrics: Fumiko Okada
Composition: Michiaki Watanabe
Arrangement: Michiaki Watanabe
Artist: Eriko Tsuruzaki

OVA Staff

Japanese Staff
Director: Toshihiro Hirano
Music: Kenji Kawai, Tatsumi Yano
Character Design: Masahiro Nishii, Toshihiro Hirano
Art director: Hiroshi Kato
Mechanical design: Keishi Hashimoto
Director of Photography: Hitoshi Sato
Animation Supervisor: Keitaro Motonaga
Design Work: Yasuhiro Morimoto
Sound director: Hitoshi Matsuoka
Animation Production: AIC
Production: KSS

English Staff
Director: Gary Dehan
Script: Gary Dehan, Lowell B. Bartholomee
Art director: Laura Attwell
Translation: Chris Hutts, Masako Arakawa
Additional Translation: Chris Hutts, Masako Arakawa
Editing: Charles Campbell, David Grundy
Engineer: Charles Campbell
Executive producer: John Ledford
International Coordination: Toru Iwakami
Logo Design: Douglas Smith
Packaging Design: Lorraine Reyes, Thanh Tran
Producer: Gary Dehan, Matt Greenfield
Production Assistant: Akiko Yoshii, Kelly Jean Beard, Maki Nagano, Masami Takahashi
Production Coordination: Janice Williams
Production Manager: Lisa J. Miller
Production Secretary: Anna Bechtol
Sound Design: Paul Killam
Subtitle Script: Matt Greenfield

OVA theme songs

Opening:

Lyrics: Kouichiro Maeda
Composition: Tatsumi Yano
Arrangement: Tatsumi Yano
Artist: Mari Sasaki

Ending:
YOU'RE THE BEST PARTNER!
Lyrics: Kouichiro Maeda
Composition: Kenji Kawai
Arrangement: Tatsumi Yano
Artist: Naomi Takahashi

Image Song:

Lyrics: Kouichiro Maeda
Composition: Kenji Kawai
Arrangement: Tatsumi Yano
Artist: Naomi Takahashi

Image Song:

Lyrics: Kouichiro Maeda
Composition: Kenji Kawai
Arrangement: Kenji Kawai
Artist: Chinami Nishimura

See also
Fight!! Iczer-1
Adventure! Iczer-3

Notes

External links
 
 
 Iczelion review at THEM Anime Reviews

1994 anime OVAs
ADV Films
Anime International Company